Furze Platt Senior School is a mixed comprehensive secondary school with academy status in Maidenhead.

The school draws pupils from across Maidenhead, Berkshire and Buckinghamshire.

The school's latest OFSTED report (November 2021) rated Furze Platt Senior School as GOOD.

Senior Leadership Team
The school is led by Headteacher, Dr Andrew Morrison, with Deputy Headteacher James Sheppard, five Assistant Headteachers and two Associate Assistant Headteachers.

Houses
The school House system is named after birds—Eagle (Green), Falcon (Red), Hawk (Blue) and Osprey (Orange). 

Until 2022 the House system consisted of eight competing Houses named after towns on the River Thames.

Leisure Centre
The school has use of the Furze Platt Leisure Centre during lessons and for clubs both before and after school. This includes a 60 station fitness gym with a range of cardio, functional and resistance equipment; three floodlit tennis / netball courts and a floodlit Astroturf.

References

Academies in the Royal Borough of Windsor and Maidenhead
Educational institutions established in 1963
Maidenhead
Secondary schools in the Royal Borough of Windsor and Maidenhead
1963 establishments in England